This is a list of television programs and specials formerly and currently broadcast by Canadian channel Much.

Current programming

Acquired Canadian programming
Cash Cab
Comedy Now!
Corner Gas
Just for Laughs: Gags

Acquired American programming
American Dad!
Awkwafina Is Nora from Queens
Crank Yankers
Crossing Swords
Friends
HouseBroken
Married... with Children
The Misery Index
The Other Two
Ridiculousness
Seinfeld
South Park
The Simpsons
Wild n Out

Special programming
Brit Awards
iHeartRadio Much Music Video Awards
Juno Awards
Live @ Much
Live in the Lot
MTV Europe Music Awards
MTV Video Music Awards
Much Presents
On Set
Polaris Music Prize
We Day

Former programming

#-E
The $100,000 Pyramid
Adam Ruins Everything
All Muscle with Funkmaster Flex
Al Music
The Almost Impossible Gameshow
Alternatino with Arturo Castro
American Ninja Warrior
America's Best Dance Crew
America's Next Top Model
Anger Management
Another Period
Arrow
The Ashlee Simpson Show
The Assets
Awkward.
Backtrax
The Beaverton
Beavis and Butt-Head
BECK: Mongolian Chop Squad
Becoming
Benders
The Bernie Mac Show
The Beaverton
Big Ticket
Big Time in Hollywood, FL
Blossom
Born to Be
Bounty Hunters
BradTV
Brickleberry
Broad City
Buffy the Vampire Slayer
Bunk
Burning Love
Cable in the Classroom
California Dreams
Care Bears: Adventures in Care-a-lot
Celebrity Deathmatch
Chappelle's Show
Childrens Hospital
City Limits
Class of 3000
Classic Much Mega Hits
The Cleveland Show
Clip Trip
Clone High
Clueless
Coca-Cola Countdown
The CollegeHumor Show
Combat Des Clips
Combat Zone
Comedy Bang! Bang!
Comedy Central Stand-Up Presents
Community
Conan
The Conventioneers
COPS
Da Mix
Daddy's Girls
Daria
Death Valley
Degrassi
Deon Cole's Black Box
Detroiters
Disband
Discovered
Dogg After Dark
Doin' Costa Rica
The DownLo
Drawn Together
Drunk History
E! True Hollywood Story (confined to musician-focused episodes)
Ed the Sock
Ed's Big Wham Bam! (special)
Egos and Icons
Electric Circus
Everybody Hates Chris
Exit
Exposed

F-J
Fameless
Family Guy
Fandemonium
FAX
Finding Carter
The Flash
French Kiss
Freshly Pressed
Friends
Fromage
Fugget About It
Funniest Wins
Garfunkel and Oates
Gigi Does It
Go with the Flow
Going Coastal
Gonna Meet A Rock Star
Gossip Girl
Got To Dance UK
Gotham
Greek
Guy Code
Hang Time
The Hard Times of RJ Berger
The Haunting Hour: The Series
Hellcats
Hip-Hop Squares
Hollywood Game Night
I Live with Models
Idiotsitter
The Inbetweeners
Inside Amy Schumer 
Instant Star
Intimate and Interactive
The IT List
The Jack and Triumph Show
Jack Osbourne: Adrenaline Junkie
Jackass
Jeff & Some Aliens
The Jeselnik Offensive
Jessica Simpson's Price of Beauty
Jimmy Kimmel Live!
Jungle Junction
The Joker's Wild

K-O
Kelly Osbourne: Turning Japanese
Kingdom
Kroll Show
The L.A. Complex
Late Night with Jimmy Fallon
The Launch
Legends of Chamberlain Heights
Legends of Tomorrow
Letterkenny
Life on Venus Ave.
LOL!
Loud
Love Court
Lucifer
Make It or Break It
Malcolm in The Middle
Match Game
Men at Work
@midnight
Mike & Mike's Excellent X-Canada Adventures
Moonbeam City
MTV's Top Pop Group
Much 911
Much AXS TV
Much Countdown
Much East
Much in Your Space
Much Spring Break
Much West - hosted by Terry David Mulligan; featured music from Canada's West Coast scene
MuchAdrenaline
MuchOnDemand
MuchNews Weekly
Music Is My Life
My Date With...
My Own
Nathan for You
The New Music
Newlyweds: Nick and Jessica
Newsreaders
The Next: Fame Is at Your Doorstep
Not Safe with Nikki Glaser
The O.C.
Odd Job Jack
The Office
Oh Sit!
One Hit Wonders
One Tree Hill
One World
Outlaws & Heroes - focused on country music
Out There

P-T
Pants Off Dance Off
Paris Hilton's My New BFF
Parks and Recreation
PB&J Otter
Perez Hilton All Access
Pimp My Ride
Pop-Up Video
Power 30
Power Hour
Pretty Little Liars
Problematic with Moshe Kasher
Producing Parker
Punk'd
Pussycat Dolls Present: The Search for the Next Doll
R U the Girl
The Ren & Stimpy Show
Review
Ride with Funkmaster Flex
Ridiculousness
Rock School
RSVP
rU Receiving
S Club
Sabrina, the Teenage Witch
Saved by the Bell
Scare Tactics
Screwed Over
The Secret Circle
The Shift
A Shot at Love
Signed
Silent Library (now on MTV2 Canada)
Sit Down, Shut Up
So 90's
So You Think You Can Dance
So You Think You Can Dance Canada
Soul in the City
South of Nowhere
South Side
Spaceballs: The Animated Series
The Spoils of Babylon and its sequel The Spoils Before Dying
Stand Up & Bite Me
Starmaker
Stars Gone Wild
Stars on Trial
Start Me Up
StyL'D
Style Star
Super Hit Video
T.I.'s Road to Redemption
Team Ninja Warrior
Teen Wolf
This Is Not Happening
TMZ
Test Pattern
'Til Death Do Us Part: Carmen and Dave
Todd and the Book of Pure Evil
The Tonight Show Starring Jimmy Fallon
Too Much 4 Much
Tosh.0
Total Blackout
Totally Untrue History Of...
TripTank

U-Z
Ugly Americans
The Vampire Diaries
Vice News Tonight
Video on Trial
Viva La Bam
VJ Search
The WB's Superstar USA
We're Experiencing Technical Difficulties
When I Was 17
Workaholics
World's Craziest Fools
X-Tendamix
Zach Stone Is Gonna Be Famous

Video blocks
#1s
#trending
Brand New Sh*t
Dance Party Friday
Dedications
French Kiss - a half-hour-long block of French language music videos
The Ledge
Loud
Much Alternative
Much Curated By
Much EDM
Much Hip-Hop
Much Mega Hits - an hour-long weekly selection of recent hit videos
Much Now & Then
Much Retro Lunch
Much Spotlight
MuchTopTens
MuchVibe
New.Music.Live
Playlist
Power Shift
The Punk Show
RapCity 
Spotlight
Today's Top 10
UR11
The Wedge
Throwback Thursday

See also
 List of programs broadcast by M3

External links
 MuchMusic's Official Site
 Much Axs

References

Much